The Unnamable may refer to:

 The Unnamable (novel), a 1953 novel by Samuel Beckett
 "The Unnamable" (short story), by H. P. Lovecraft
 The Unnamable (film), a 1988 film based on the H. P. Lovecraft  short story